Bubastes is a genus of beetles in the family Buprestidae.

Species 
Bubastes contains the following species:

 Bubastes achardi Obenberger, 1920
 Bubastes aenea Obenberger, 1922
 Bubastes australasiae Obenberger, 1922
Bubastes barkeri Bílý & Hanlon, 2020
 Bubastes blackburni Obenberger, 1941
 Bubastes boisduvali Obenberger, 1941
 Bubastes borealis Obenberger, 1928
 Bubastes bostrychoides (Théry, 1910)
 Bubastes carnarvonensis Obenberger, 1941
 Bubastes carteri Obenberger, 1941
 Bubastes chapmani Obenberger, 1941
 Bubastes cylindrica Macleay, 1888
Bubastes deserta Bílý & Hanlon, 2020
Bubastes dichroa Bílý & Hanlon, 2020
 Bubastes erbeni Obenberger, 1941
 Bubastes euryspiloides Obenberger, 1922
Bubastes flavocaerulea Bílý & Hanlon, 2020
 Bubastes formosa Carter, 1915
 Bubastes germari Obenberger, 1928
 Bubastes globicollis Thomson, 1879
Bubastes hasenpuschi Bílý & Hanlon, 2020
 Bubastes inconsistans Thomson, 1879
Bubastes iridiventris Bílý & Hanlon, 2020
Bubastes iris Bílý & Hanlon, 2020
 Bubastes kirbyi Obenberger, 1928
 Bubastes laticollis Blackburn, 1888
 Bubastes leai Carter, 1924
Bubastes macmillani Bílý & Hanlon, 2020
Bubastes magnifica Bílý & Hanlon, 2020
Bubastes michaelpowelli Bílý & Hanlon, 2020
 Bubastes niveiventris Obenberger, 1922
 Bubastes obscura Obenberger, 1922
 Bubastes occidentalis Blackburn, 1891
 Bubastes odewahni Obenberger, 1928
 Bubastes olivina Obenberger, 1920
 Bubastes persplendens Obenberger, 1920
Bubastes pilbarensis Bílý & Hanlon, 2020
Bubastes remota Bílý & Hanlon, 2020
 Bubastes saundersi Obenberger, 1928
 Bubastes septentrionalis Obenberger, 1941
 Bubastes simillima Obenberger, 1922
 Bubastes sphaenoida Laporte & Gory, 1836
 Bubastes splendens Blackburn, 1891
 Bubastes strandi Obenberger, 1920
 Bubastes subflavipennis Carter, 1937
 Bubastes subnigricollis Carter, 1939
 Bubastes suturalis Carter, 1915
 Bubastes thomsoni Obenberger, 1928
 Bubastes vagans Blackburn, 1892
 Bubastes vanrooni Obenberger, 1928
Bubastes viridiaurea Bílý & Hanlon, 2020
 Bubastes viridicuprea Obenberger, 1922

References

Buprestidae genera